Formosa Betrayed may refer to:

 Formosa Betrayed (book), a 1965 book by George H. Kerr
 Formosa Betrayed (film), a 2009 film directed by Adam Kane